Dessert is a course that concludes a meal. The course consists of sweet foods, such as confections, and possibly a beverage such as dessert wine and liqueur. In some parts of the world, such as much of Greece and West Africa, and most parts of China, there is no tradition of a dessert course to conclude a meal.

The term dessert can apply to many confections, such as biscuits, cakes, cookies, custards, gelatins, ice creams, pastries, pies, puddings, macaroons, sweet soups, tarts, and fruit salad. Fruit is also commonly found in dessert courses because of its naturally occurring sweetness.  Some cultures sweeten foods that are more commonly savory to create desserts.

Etymology 
The word "dessert" originated from the French word desservir, meaning "to clear the table". Its first known use in English was in 1600, in a health education manual entitled Naturall and artificial Directions for Health, written by William Vaughan.

In his book Sweet Invention: A History of Dessert (2011), Michael Krondl explains that it refers to the fact that dessert was served after the table had been cleared of other dishes.

The term dates from the 14th century but attained its current meaning around the beginning of the 20th century, when "service à la française" (setting a variety of dishes on the table at the same time) was replaced with "service à la russe" (presenting a meal in multiple courses).

Other names
The word "dessert" is most commonly used for this course in Australia, Canada, Ireland, New Zealand, and the United States, while it is one of several synonyms (including "pudding", "sweet" and "afters") in the United Kingdom and some other Commonwealth countries.

History 

Sweets were fed to the gods in ancient Mesopotamia and ancient India and other ancient civilizations. Herodotus mentions that Persian meals featured many desserts, and were more varied in their sweet offerings than the main dishes. German army officer Helmuth von Moltke whilst serving in the Ottoman Empire noted the unusual presentation of courses with the sweet courses served between roasts and other savory dishes. 
 
Dried fruit and honey were probably the first sweeteners used in most of the world, but the spread of sugarcane around the world was essential to the development of dessert. Sugarcane was grown and refined in India before 500 BC and was crystallized, making it easy to transport, by AD 500. Sugar and sugarcane were traded, making sugar available to Macedonia by 300 BC and China by AD 600.  In the Indian subcontinent, the Middle East, and China, sugar has been a staple of cooking and desserts for over a thousand years.

Sugarcane and sugar were little known and rare in Europe until the twelfth century or later when the Crusades and then colonization spread its use. Europeans began to manufacture sugar in the Middle Ages, and more sweet desserts became available. Even then sugar was so expensive usually only the wealthy could indulge on special occasions.  The first apple pie recipe was published in 1381. The earliest documentation of the term cupcake was in "Seventy-five Receipts for Pastry, Cakes, and Sweetmeats" in 1828 in Eliza Leslie's Receipts cookbook.

The Industrial Revolution in Europe and later America caused led to the mass-production of foodstuffs, including desserts, that could be processed, preserved, canned, and packaged. Frozen foods, including desserts, became very popular starting in the 1920s.

Ingredients 
Sweet desserts usually contain cane sugar, palm sugar, brown sugar, honey, or some types of syrup such as molasses, maple syrup, treacle, or corn syrup. Other common ingredients in Western-style desserts are flour or other starches, cooking fats such as butter or lard, dairy, eggs, salt, acidic ingredients such as lemon juice, and spices and other flavoring agents such as chocolate, coffee, peanut butter, fruits, and nuts. The proportions of these ingredients, along with the preparation methods, play a major part in the consistency, texture, and flavor of the end product.

Sugars contribute moisture and tenderness to baked goods. Flour or starch components serves as a protein and gives the dessert structure. Fats contribute moisture and can enable the development of flaky layers in pastries and pie crusts.  The dairy products in baked goods keep the desserts moist. Many desserts also contain eggs, in order to form custard or to aid in the rising and thickening of a cake-like substance. Egg yolks specifically contribute to the richness of desserts.  Egg whites can act as a leavening agent or provide structure.  Further innovation in the healthy eating movement has led to more information being available about vegan and gluten-free substitutes for the standard ingredients, as well as replacements for refined sugar.

Desserts can contain many spices and extracts to add a variety of flavors. Salt and acids are added to desserts to balance sweet flavors and create a contrast in flavors. Some desserts are coffee-flavored, for example an iced coffee soufflé or coffee biscuits. Alcohols and liqueurs can also be used as an ingredient, to make alcoholic desserts.

Varieties and elements

Dessert consist of variations of tastes, textures, and appearances. Desserts can be defined as a usually sweeter course that concludes a meal. This definition includes a range of courses ranging from fruits or dried nuts to multi-ingredient cakes and pies. Many cultures have different variations of dessert. In modern times the variations of desserts have usually been passed down or come from geographical regions. This is one cause for the variation of desserts. These are some major categories in which desserts can be placed.

Cakes

Cakes are sweet tender breads made with sugar and delicate flour. Cakes can vary from light, airy sponge cakes to dense cakes with less flour. Common flavorings include dried, candied or fresh fruit, nuts, cocoa or extracts. They may be filled with fruit preserves or dessert sauces (like pastry cream), iced with buttercream or other icings, and decorated with marzipan, piped borders, or candied fruit. Cake is often served as a celebratory dish on ceremonial occasions, for example weddings, anniversaries, and birthdays. Small-sized cakes have become popular, in the form of cupcakes and petits fours, an example of which can be the portuguese “bolo de arroz”.

Puddings
Puddings are similar to custards in that their base is cream or milk. However, their primary difference is that puddings are thickened with starches such as corn starch or tapioca. On the other hand, custards are thickened using only eggs and are usually more firm.

Small cakes and pastries

A batched dough between a cake and pastry by the mix of ingredients. An Old French bescuit, commonly spelt in English as biscuit, is a derivation of Latin for twice-baked. A Dutch koekje, commonly spelt in English as cookie, is a derivation of cake-ie , meaning little cake.
 
This form of dough can have a texture that is crisp, hard, chewy, or soft – in the UK a biscuit is the former two and a cookie is typically the latter. Examples include a ginger nut, shortbread biscuit and chocolate chip cookie.

Other small cakes and pastries can also be counted as under these terms, due to their size and relative similarity to cookies and biscuits, such as jaffa cakes and Eccles cakes.

Confection

Confection, also called candy, sweets or lollies, features sugar or honey as a principal ingredient.

Many involve sugar heated into crystals with subtle differences. Dairy and sugar based include caramel, fudge and toffee or taffy. They are multiple forms of egg and sugar meringues. and similar confections. Unheated sugar co-adulate into icings, preservatives and sauces with other ingredients.

Chocolate
Theobroma cacao beans can be a substitute or more commonly mixed with sugar to form chocolate. Pure, unsweetened dark chocolate contains primarily cocoa solids. Cocoa butter is also added in varying proportions. Much of the chocolate currently consumed is in the form of sweet chocolate, combining chocolate with sugar. Milk chocolate is sweet chocolate that additionally contains milk powder or condensed milk. White chocolate contains cocoa butter, sugar, and milk, but no cocoa solids. Dark chocolate is produced by adding fat and sugar to the cacao mixture, with no milk or much less than milk chocolate.

Mithai (sweets) 
Mithai, derived from the Sanskrit word 'sharkara', represents the range of Indian desserts.

Custards

These kinds of desserts usually include a thickened dairy base. Custards are cooked and thickened with eggs. Baked custards include crème brûlée and flan. They are often used as ingredients in other desserts, for instance as a filling for pastries or pies.

Deep-fried

Many cuisines include a dessert made of deep-fried starch-based batter or dough. In many countries, a doughnut is a flour-based batter that has been deep-fried. It is sometimes filled with custard or jelly. Fritters are fruit pieces in a thick batter that have been deep fried. Gulab jamun is an Indian dessert made of milk solids kneaded into a dough, deep-fried, and soaked in honey. Churros are a deep-fried and sugared dough that is eaten as dessert or a snack in many countries.

Frozen

Ice cream, gelato, sorbet and shaved-ice desserts fit into this category. Ice cream is a cream base that is churned as it is frozen to create a creamy consistency. Gelato uses a milk base and has less air whipped in than ice cream, making it denser. Sorbet is made from churned fruit and is not dairy based. Shaved-ice desserts are made by shaving a block of ice and adding flavored syrup or juice to the ice shavings.

Gelatin 

Jellied desserts are made with a sweetened liquid thickened with gelatin or another thickening agent. They are traditional in many cultures. Grass jelly and annin tofu are Chinese jellied desserts. Yōkan is a Japanese jellied dessert. In English-speaking countries, many dessert recipes are based on gelatin with fruit or whipped cream added. The vegetarian substitute for Gelatin is Agar. Marshmallow is also most commonly made with gelatin.

Pastries 

 Pastries are sweet baked pastry products. Pastries can either take the form of light and flaky bread with an airy texture, such as a croissant or unleavened dough with a high fat content and crispy texture, such as shortbread. Pastries are often flavored or filled with fruits, chocolate, nuts, and spices. Pastries are sometimes eaten with tea or coffee as a breakfast food.

Pies, cobblers, and clafoutis

Pies and cobblers are a crust with a filling. The crust can be either made from either a pastry or crumbs. Pie fillings range from fruits to puddings; cobbler fillings are generally fruit-based. Clafoutis are made of batter poured over a fruit-based filling before baking.

Sweet soups 

Tong sui, literally translated as "sugar water" and also known as tim tong, is a collective term for any sweet, warm soup or custard served as a dessert at the end of a meal in Cantonese cuisine. Tong sui are a Cantonese specialty and are rarely found in other regional cuisines of China. Outside of Cantonese-speaking communities, soupy desserts generally are not recognized as a distinct category, and the term tong sui is not used.

Wines
Dessert wines are sweet wines typically served with dessert. There is no simple definition of a dessert wine. In the UK, a dessert wine is considered to be any sweet wine drunk with a meal, as opposed to the white fortified wines (fino and amontillado sherry) drunk before the meal, and the red fortified wines (port and madeira) drunk after it. Thus, most fortified wines are regarded as distinct from dessert wines, but some of the less strong fortified white wines, such as Pedro Ximénez sherry and Muscat de Beaumes-de-Venise, are regarded as honorary dessert wines. In the United States, by contrast, a dessert wine is legally defined as any wine over 14% alcohol by volume, which includes all fortified wines - and is taxed at higher rates as a result. Examples include Sauternes and Tokaji Aszú.

Gallery

By continent

Africa 
Throughout much of central and western Africa, there is no tradition of a dessert course following a meal. Fruit or fruit salad would be eaten instead, which may be spiced, or sweetened with a sauce. In some former colonies in the region, the colonial power has influenced desserts – for example, the Angolan cocada amarela (yellow coconut) resembles baked desserts in Portugal.

Asia 

In Asia, desserts are often eaten between meals as snacks rather than as a concluding course. There is widespread use of rice flour in East Asian desserts, which often include local ingredients such as coconut milk, palm sugar, and tropical fruit. In India, where sugarcane has been grown and refined since before 500 BC, desserts have been an important part of the diet for thousands of years; types of desserts include burfis, halvahs, jalebis, and laddus.

Bubble tea, which originated in Taiwan, is a kind of dessert made with flavored tea or milk and tapioca. It is well known across the world.

Europe 

In Ukraine and Russia, breakfast foods such as nalysnyky or blintz or oladi (pancake), and syrniki are served with honey and jam as desserts.

In the Netherlands vla is a popular dessert. It is a custard-like dessert that is served cold. Popular flavours are: vanilla, chocolate, caramel, and several fruit flavours. There is also hopjesvla which is flavoured like a Hopje, a Dutch coffee and caramel sweet.

The traditional dessert for informal meals in France consists of cheese or fresh fruit with coffee. However, the French tradition of pastry is highly developed, and desserts in haute cuisine may be very elaborate, with generous use of cream and butter.

Because of its long Christian history, all countries of Europe have developed traditional desserts and sweet snacks for the Christmas season.

North America 

European colonization of the Americas yielded the introduction of a number of ingredients and cooking styles. The various styles continued expanding well into the 19th and 20th centuries, proportional to the influx of immigrants.

South America 

Dulce de leche is a very common confection in Argentina. In Bolivia, sugarcane, honey and coconut are traditionally used in desserts. Tawa tawa is a Bolivian sweet fritter prepared using sugar cane, and helado de canela is a dessert that is similar to sherbet which is prepared with cane sugar and cinnamon. Coconut tarts, puddings cookies and candies are also consumed in Bolivia. Brazil has a variety of candies such as brigadeiros (chocolate fudge balls), cocada (a coconut sweet), beijinhos (coconut truffles and clove) and romeu e julieta (cheese with a guava jam known as goiabada). Peanuts are used to make paçoca, rapadura and pé-de-moleque. Local common fruits are turned in juices and used to make chocolates, ice pops and ice cream. In Chile, kuchen has been described as a "trademark dessert". Several desserts in Chile are prepared with manjar, (caramelized milk), including alfajor, flan, cuchufli and arroz con leche. Desserts consumed in Colombia include dulce de leche, waffle cookies, puddings, nougat, coconut with syrup and thickened milk with sugarcane syrup. Desserts in Ecuador tend to be simple, and desserts are a moderate part of the cuisine. Desserts consumed in Ecuador include tres leches cake, flan, candies and various sweets.

Oceania 

In Australia, meals are often finished with dessert. This includes various fruits. More complex desserts include cakes, pies and cookies, which are sometimes served during special occasions.

New Zealand and Australia have a long-standing debate over which country invented the Pavlova. The pavlova is named after Anna Pavlova, who visited both countries in the 1920s.

Market 
The market for desserts has grown over the last few decades, which was greatly increased by the commercialism of baking desserts and the rise of food productions. Desserts are present in most restaurants as the popularity has increased.  Many commercial stores have been established as solely desserts stores. Ice cream parlors have been around since before 1800. Many businesses started advertising campaigns focusing solely on desserts.  The tactics used to market desserts are very different depending on the audience for example desserts can be advertised with popular movie characters to target children.  The rise of companies like Food Network has marketed many shows which feature dessert and their creation. Shows like these have displayed extreme desserts and made a game show atmosphere which made desserts a more competitive field.

Desserts are a standard staple in restaurant menus, with different degrees of variety. Pie and cheesecake were among the most popular dessert courses ordered in U.S. restaurants in 2012.

Nutrition 
Dessert foods often contain relatively high amounts of sugar and fats and, as a result, higher calorie counts per gram than other foods. Fresh or cooked fruit with minimal added sugar or fat is an exception.

See also 

 Chinese desserts
 Culinary art

List articles 

 List of desserts
 List of dessert sauces
 List of Bangladeshi sweets and desserts
 List of foods
 List of Indian sweets and desserts
 List of Indonesian desserts
 List of Italian desserts
 List of Pakistani sweets and desserts
 List of Sri Lankan sweets and desserts
 List of Turkish desserts

References

Notes

Further reading 

 
16th-century neologisms
Courses (food)